Bang Kapi is a khwaeng (subdistrict) of Huai Khwang District, Bangkok.

History
Its name "Bang Kapi" after "Thung Bang Kapi" (ทุ่งบางกะปิ), a vast field covers the area from the south of Ayutthaya Province to Bangkok and the east side of Chao Phraya to Nakhon Nayok Rivers in the past. Its landscape was lowlands, there are swamps, grove woods, dense grasses, dense reeds alternately above sea level, only 1–2 m (about 3–6 ft). Therefore, floods occur every year for 3–4 months at a time. It was also the habitat of many kinds of wildlife such as tigers, elephants, barking deers, gaurs, as well as Schomburgk's deers etc. It was a part of "Thung Luang" (ทุ่งหลวง, great field).

In the King Rama III' reign, a khlong (canal) Saen Saep was dug for use as a shortcut for transporting military hardware for use in the Siamese–Vietnamese War. It flows through the area of Thung Bang Kapi to the east at Chachoengsao Province. It is regarded as the longest canal in the country, therefore it has various branches, such as Khlong Bang Kapi, Khlong Hua Mak, Khlong Chan, Khlong Tan, Khlong Chao Khun Sing etc. The names of these places have now become the names of the subdistrict administrative districts in Bangkok today. On both sides of the Khlong Saen Saep has also become a settlement for Muslim residents, since they are laborers who play a principle role in canalizing khlong.

The broadness of Thung Bang Kapi covers the areas from Bang Kapi, Wang Thonglang, Lat Phrao to Sukhumvit Roads at present. This field also referred to in the masterpiece tragedy novel Plae Kao (แผลเก่า) by Mai Mueangdoem as the backdrop of the whole story. The extension of Phetchaburi Road (New Phetchaburi Road) to Khlong Tan in the early-1960s resulted in a number of sois (alleyways) bridging Sukhumvit Road that ran parallel to the south. And as a result, Bang Kapi area, as it was known to be extensive, has reduced its size as it is today.

In 1974, the area together with Huai Khwang was split off from Phaya Thai District as a full district and subdistrict.

Geography
Bang Kapi has most of the area between Phetchaburi (section New Phetchaburi Road) and Rama IX Roads. It has 12 communities. The area is bordered by neighbouring subdistricts (from north clockwise): Huai Khwang in its district (Khlong Saen Saep is a borderline), Wang Thonglang of Wang Thonglang District (Khlong Lat Phrao is a borderline), Hua Mak of Bang Kapi District (Khlong Saen Saep is a borderline), Suan Luang of Suan Luang District (Khlong Saen Saep is a borderline), Khlong Tan Nuea of Watthana District (Khlong Saen Saep is a borderline), Makkasan of Ratchathewi District (Asok-Montri Road is a borderline).

Places

Khlong Tan Railway Station
Asok Railway Halt
Praram 9 Hospital
Thai-Japanese Association School
Wat Uthai Tharam (Wat Bang Kapi)
Petcharavej Hospital
Piyavate Hospital
Makkasan Metropolitan Police Station
Somdet Saranrat Manirom Park

References

Huai Khwang district
Subdistricts of Bangkok